Albert Turnbull (29 October 1866 — 29 November 1929) was a New Zealand cricketer who played for Otago. He was born and died in Dunedin.

Turnbull made a single first-class appearance for the team, during the 1896–97 season, against Queensland. He scored a duck in the first innings and a single run in the second.

Turnbull's brother, Percival, also played a single first-class game for the team.

See also
 List of Otago representative cricketers

External links
Albert Turnbull at Cricket Archive 

1866 births
1929 deaths
New Zealand cricketers
Otago cricketers